Gareth Wyatt (born 4 March 1977 in Pontypridd) is a Welsh rugby union player who has won two caps for the Wales national rugby union team.

Education

A fluent Welsh speaker, Wyatt attended Ysgol Gymraeg Llantrisant (Llantrisant Welsh Primary School) and later Ysgol Gyfun Llanhari Welsh comprehensive school.

Club career

Wyatt started his professional career at Pontypridd RFC, winning a regional contract at the beginning of the 2003 season with the Celtic Warriors.  In 2004, due to a combination of factors involving both the Welsh Rugby Union and owner Leighton Samuel, the team was disbanded and players transferred to various other regions and teams throughout Europe.

Due to his ability to play in several positions, Wing, Fullback and Fly Half, Wyatt found a contract playing for the Newport Gwent Dragons alongside other notable former Celtic Warrior teammates including Kevin Morgan, Ceri Sweeney, Michael Owen and Gareth Cooper. He left the Newport Gwent Dragons in May 2009 and joined Newport RFC. Wyatt departed Newport at the end of the 2009/2010 season and returned to Pontypridd in the Summer.

International career

Wyatt attained two full Wales caps scoring one try. He also represented Wales at Sevens (Three commonwealth games), Under 19 level, Under 21 level and Wales A.

References

External links
 
 
 
 

1977 births
Welsh rugby union players
Wales international rugby union players
Living people
Pontypridd RFC players
Rugby union players from Pontypridd
Dragons RFC players
Newport RFC players
People educated at Ysgol Gyfun Llanhari
Rugby sevens players at the 2002 Commonwealth Games
Commonwealth Games rugby sevens players of Wales
Rugby sevens players at the 1998 Commonwealth Games